Valentina Evgenyevna Gunina (born February 4, 1989, in Murmansk) is a Russian chess grandmaster. She has won thrice the Women's European Individual Chess Championship (2012, 2014, 2018) and four times the Russian Women's Championship (2011, 2013, 2014, 2021). She was a member of the gold medal-winning Russian team at the Women's Chess Olympiads of 2010, 2012, 2014, at the Women's European Team Chess Championships of 2007, 2009, 2011, 2015, 2017,  2019 and at the Women's World Team Chess Championship of 2017.

Gunina won the 2016 London Chess Classic Super Rapidplay Open in one of the best performances for a female at a top level chess tournament, defeating several male Grandmasters along the way.

Career
Gunina won the gold medal in the 2000 European under-12 girls championship, 2003 world U14 girls championship, 2004 European U16 girls championship and in the 2007 world U18 girls championship. She was the bronze medalist in the 2006 European U18 girls championship.

In 2006, she won the Women's Russian Championship Higher League scoring 7/9 and qualified for the Russian Women's Championship Superfinal. She placed eleventh with 2.5/11. In 2008, she won for the second time the Women's Russian Championship Higher League with 7.5/9. In the Superfinal she scored 4/9. In 2009, she won the Russian junior (under 20) girls championship.

In 2012, she won the Women's World Blitz Championship in Batumi, Georgia. In the same year, Gunina competed for the first time in the Women's World Championship: she defeated Gu Xiaobing in the first round, then she was knocked out by Alisa Galliamova in round two. Gunina won the Russian women's rapid chess championship 2014 in Saint Petersburg.

In January 2015, she took part in the Tata Steel Challengers tournament in Wijk aan Zee, the Netherlands, where she scored 5/13. At the Women's World Chess Championship 2015 Gunina made it to the third round, where she was eliminated by Pia Cramling, after knocking out Camilla Baginskaite and Olga Girya. In September 2015, she won the Moscow Women's Blitz Championship.

In February 2019, she became the first ever winner of The Cairns Cup, in Saint Louis, as she ended victoriously the tournament with 7 out of 9.

In late May 2019, Valentina faced American GM Irina Krush in the quarterfinal match of the 2019 Women's Speed Chess Championship, an online blitz and bullet competition hosted by Chess.com. Valentina dominated the match and won with an overall score of 24–5.

Awards
On 25 October 2014, she was awarded the Medal of the Order "For Merit to the Fatherland", 1st class "for great contribution to the development of physical culture and sport, the high sporting achievements at the XXXXI World Chess Olympiad in Tromsø (Norway)".

Personal life
Together with 43 other Russian elite chess players, Gunina signed an open letter to Russian president Vladimir Putin, protesting against the 2022 Russian invasion of Ukraine and expressing solidarity with the Ukrainian people.

References

External links

1989 births
Living people
Chess grandmasters
Female chess grandmasters
Chess woman grandmasters
World Youth Chess Champions
European Chess Champions
People from Murmansk
Russian female chess players
Recipients of the Medal of the Order "For Merit to the Fatherland" I class
Sportspeople from Murmansk Oblast
Russian activists against the 2022 Russian invasion of Ukraine